Propeller head may refer to:

Propeller beanie, a seamed cap with a decorative propeller on top.
Propellerheads, a British big beat musical ensemble, formed in 1995.
An alternate term for a propeller hub, the part of a ship or aircraft propeller where the blades attach.